The Federal Research Public Access Act (FRPAA) is a proposal to require open public access to research funded by eleven U.S. federal government agencies.  It was originally proposed by Senators John Cornyn and Joe Lieberman in 2006 and then again in 2010, and then once more in 2012.

A later version of the bill, the Fair Access to Science and Technology Research Act, was introduced in 2013 and 2015.

Provisions of bill 
The FRPAA would require that those eleven agencies with research expenditures over $100 million, create online repositories of journal articles of the research completed by that agency and make them publicly available. They must be maintained and preserved by the agency, or another repository that permits free and open access. It must be available to users without charge within six months after it has been published in a peer-reviewed journal.

The agencies included in this bill are: 
 Department of Agriculture
 Department of Commerce
 Department of Defense
 Department of Education
 Department of Energy
 Department of Health and Human Services
 Department of Homeland Security
 Department of Transportation
 Environmental Protection Agency
 National Aeronautics and Space Administration
 National Science Foundation

Legislative history

Reaction

Support
In addition to Senator John Cornyn and Senator Joe Lieberman, Representative Michael F. Doyle, along with Frederick Boucher, Michael Capuano, Jerry Costello, Bill Foster, Barney Frank, Gregg Harper, Paul Hodes, Tim Holden, Dennis Kucinich, Rick Larsen, Zoe Lofgren, Stephen Lynch, Dana Rohrabacher, Fortney Stark, Debbie Wasserman Schultz, and Henry Waxman have co-sponsored a similar bill in the House of Representatives (H.R. 5037).

As of July 19, 2010, 120 Higher Education Leaders support this bill.

On March 28, 2012, 52 Nobel Laureates signed an open letter to the US Congress expressing their support for this bill.

Opposition
The Association of American Publishers opposes the bill on behalf of 81 scholarly publishing organizations alleging that the bill forces the same deadline for disciplines in which that deadline is burdensome, limits the options of government-funded researchers, forces a change in publishers' business models, and will create a cost burden on federal agencies.

See also 
Open access mandate
NIH Public Access Policy
Fair Copyright in Research Works Act
Research Works Act

References

Further reading 
As COMPETES Act Is Signed into Law, 'Wait-and-See' Is the Attitude on Further OA Legislation
NEW ENGLAND UNIVERSITY PRESIDENTS BACK BILL FOR PUBLIC ACCESS 
Open Letter on Open Access | Inside Higher Ed
Scientists Embrace Openness
Times Higher Education, "Learning to share"
White House Signals Interest in Open Access with Public Call for Comments

United States proposed federal government administration legislation
Open access (publishing)
Proposed legislation of the 109th United States Congress
Proposed legislation of the 111th United States Congress
Proposed legislation of the 112th United States Congress